Streets of Fire is the second album of the hard rock project Place Vendome. The songwriting for this album was provided by Torsti Spoof (Leverage), Ronny Milianowicz (Saint Deamon), Robert Säll (Work of Art) and Magnus Karlsson (Primal Fear).

A music video was filmed for the song , marking the visual return of vocalist Michael Kiske since 1996.

It was released on 20 February 2009 with cover art credited to Carl André Beckston.

Track listing

Japanese Bonus Track

Credits

Band members
 Michael Kiske – vocals
 Uwe Reitenauer – guitars
 Dennis Ward – bass guitar, producer, engineer, mixing, mastering
 Kosta Zafiriou – drums
 Gunther Werno - keyboards

References

External links
 Frontiers Records official website - P.V - Streets of Fire
 Michael Kiske official website - Biography

2009 albums
Place Vendome (band) albums
Frontiers Records albums
Albums produced by Dennis Ward (musician)